The Green Bay Blizzard is a professional indoor football team based in Ashwaubenon, Wisconsin, founded in 2003. The Blizzard began play in the Indoor Football League in 2010, after having played the previous seven seasons in af2, the now-defunct minor league of the Arena Football League. They play their home games at the Resch Center. The team's logo represents Bruiser, the team mascot.

History

af2: 2003–2009
The Blizzard started out as an af2 expansion team in 2003 with Jose Jefferson as the team's head coach.  The team finished 2–14, last in the National Conference Midwest Division.  They only averaged 2,957 fans a game.

At the beginning of the 2004 season, the Blizzard replaced Jose Jefferson with former Green Bay Packers linebacker Brian Noble. Despite the team improving during the 2004 season, the Blizzard finished 6–10.

In 2005, the team moved from the National Conference to the American Conference of AF2.  The Blizzard became a member of the American Conference's East division.  The team also replaced Noble with veteran Arena Football League Bob Landsee.  The team continued their trend of improvement in 2005 finishing 9–7, good for 3rd in the East Division, and reaching the postseason for the first time. They fell in the first round to Wilkes-Barre/Scranton.

Blizzard head coach Bob Landsee became the first coach in team history to return for their second season.  The Blizzard also came under new ownership as former coach Brian Noble lead an investment group that purchased the team.  Noble became the new President of the four-year-old franchise and began a complete revitalization of the organization, drastically lowering ticket prices in an attempt to boost their average game attendance.  The team set a new single game attendance record of 7,184 in the season finale against Louisville.  The team experienced an improvement on the field as well, going into the final game of the 2006 regular season tied with the Louisville Fire for first in the East Division at 9–6.  This set up a showdown between the two teams at the Resch Center for the East Division title, which the Blizzard won 54–53. The Blizzard earned a first round bye before facing the 2005 ArenaCup Champion Memphis Xplorers in the Blizzard's inaugural home playoff game, which they won 67–50.  This victory sent them to the American Conference Championship Game against the Florida Firecats, which they won 60–47, capturing the conference title and advancing to ArenaCup VII, where they lost to the Spokane Shock 54–37.

Coach Bob Landsee had difficulties resulting from surgery and was forced to take a leave of absence for the 2007 season. He was replaced by defensive coordinator Doug Lytle, who led the Blizzard to a 9–7 season, remaining undefeated at home yet losing all but one road game. The Blizzard made the playoffs for the third consecutive year and surprised their rival and Midwest Division Champion Quad City Steamwheelers 39–34 in the first-round game.   The Blizzard carried over their success at home from the regular season by defeating Louisville in the second round 37–27, but lost to the Wilkes-Barre/Scranton Pioneers in their second consecutive American Conference championship game, 46–43.

Head coach Bob Landsee returned in 2008 and led the Blizzard to an 11–5 record and a Midwest Division title. The Blizzard set a single-game record for attendance against Lexington with 7,258 and had the largest average attendance in team history with an average of 6,125 fans per game.  In the first round of the playoffs the Blizzard defeated Lexington 65–37 after having lost twice to them in the regular season. The Blizzard then hosted Manchester in a second-round game, losing 55–54 on a last minute Manchester two-point conversion.

After beginning the season by defeating the defending ArenaCup Champion Tennessee Valley Vipers. The Blizzard failed to capture a consecutive Midwest Division title and finished the season 10–6, earning the #6 seed in the 2009 af2 playoffs. The Blizzard advanced to their third American Conference Championship, losing to #1 seed Wilkes-Barre/Scranton Pioneers 72–67.

Indoor Football League: 2010–present
In October 2009, the team announced that unless the team found additional investors that they would be forced to cease operations. The Blizzard found new investors in an ownership group named Titletown Football Group, LLC, led by Green Bay Bullfrogs president Jeff Royle, who purchased the team in late October. In November 2009, the team announced that they would play the 2010 season in the Indoor Football League (IFL) due to AF2 filing for bankruptcy. At a team open house on November 17, 2009, the Blizzard announced their new head coach would be Rik Richards.

On December 5, 2009, the Blizzard announced a name-the-team contest.  The Blizzard name and intellectual property was held by the then-defunct Arena Football League (AFL), which was the parent of the Blizzard's former league, af2. The assets of the former AFL were purchased by the newly formed Arena Football 1. The team ownership group was still attempting to purchase the rights to the Blizzard name and had decided to continue with the contest in case the Blizzard name was not able to be purchased, but the owners were able to acquire the Blizzard name and imagery.

Early success
On December 15, 2009, the IFL announced the divisional alignment and schedule for the 2010 season.  The Blizzard competed in the United Conference, Central North Division with the La Crosse Spartans, Chicago Slaughter and Bloomington Extreme. The Blizzard won the Central North Division, but lost their first round playoff game against the Chicago Slaughter.

For the 2011 season, the Blizzard competed in the United Conference, Great Lakes Division, which was a renamed Central North Division (the Spartans, Slaughter, and Extreme, along with the Blizzard).  The Blizzard won the division title again and improved to 11–3 record. They defeated the Reading Express in their first round playoff game, but lost the United Conference Championship game to the eventual champions, the Sioux Falls Storm.

Because of various teams leaving the IFL, either to join other leagues or cease operations altogether, the league played the 2012 season format in two conferences with no divisions.  While the Spartans had ceased operations, the Blizzard's divisional rivals, the Slaughter and the newly renamed Bloomington Edge joined in the single-table United Conference along with the Reading Express, Sioux Falls Storm, Cedar Rapids Titans, Lehigh Valley Steelhawks and Omaha Beef. The Blizzard finished 11–3 again, for second place in the conference and three games behind the undefeated Storm. The Blizzard defeated the Edge in the first round, but again lost to the Storm for the United Conference Championship.

Playoff drought

2013 season 

With the Beef, Edge, and Steelhawks leaving the IFL for other leagues and the Express suspending operations, the United Conference was reduced to five teams for the 2013 season, with the Blizzard, Slaughter, Titans, and Storm all returning and the newly renamed Texas Revolution (formerly the Allen Wranglers) moving from the Intense Conference. Junior Aumavae, a nose tackle who spent the 2012 season playing for the Blizzard, was signed by the New York Jets in late March 2013. After compiling a 1–5 record in the season's first six games, head coach Robert Fuller was replaced by defensive coordinator Chad Baldwin. They finished the season 4-10.

2014 season

After the 2013 season, the Chicago Slaughter moved to the Continental Indoor Football League, but the United Conference continued to have five teams with the expansion Bemidji Axemen. In September 2013, Titletown Football Group, LLC sold their majority ownership stake in the team to Larry and Kathy Treankler. The Blizzard began the 2014 season under head coach Chad Baldwin. After the team began the season 0–6, Baldwin was replaced by offensive coordinator Tommie Williams for the remainder of the season. They finished 2-12, losing all of their road games as well as losing their last four games. The Blizzard also introduced their new logo during this season.

2015 season

Tommie Williams had his interim tag removed and was named the head coach of the Blizzard. The Blizzard brought back veteran quarterback Donovan Porterie and traded for Carl Sims. The Blizzard finished with a record of 6-8.

2016 season

On November 3, 2015, Williams and the Blizzard agreed to part ways. On December 7, 2015, Chris Williams was hired as the head coach of the Blizzard. The team finished with a record of 5-11, losing all but one road game.

2017 season

For the 2017 season, the Blizzard had a home record of 1-7 with the only home win being the last home game against the Salt Lake Screaming Eagles. The Blizzard finished with a record of 3-13;  

2018 season

To open the 2018 season, the Blizzard started out 0–5 which lead to coach Chris Williams being relieved of his duties following the Week 6 bye, in which he was replaced by Corey Roberson as interim head coach. The Blizzard finished the season 2-12.

2019 season

Corey Roberson was named head coach for the 2019 season. Under Roberson, the Blizzard had a 9-5 regular season record and qualified for the playoffs for the first time since 2012. Corey Roberson was named the IFL's Coach of the Year.

2020 season 

The League started in March 7th with two games, but after the COVID-19 pandemic, the IFL postponed and later canceled all of their games for the season.

2021 season 

After the hiatus from the previous season, the IFL returned and the Blizzard won only one road game, while they lost their last four games again for the second time in five complete seasons. The team finished 5-9.

2022 season 

In 2022, the IFL made the return of conferences for the first time since 2017, and the Green Bay Blizzard was selected to be in the Eastern Conference. The team finished 6-10.

Statistics and records

Season-by-season results

Head coach records
Note: Statistics are correct through the 2022 Indoor Football League season

Notable players

Current roster

Individual awards
The following is a list of all Blizzard players who have won league awards:

Current staff

References

External links
 Official website
 FrostBite - Weekly Podcast

 
2003 establishments in Wisconsin